The 2012 Cerezo Osaka season is Cerezo Osaka's 3rd consecutive season, 14th season overall in J.League Division 1 and 40th overall in the Japanese top flight. It also includes the 2012 J.League Cup and the 2011 Emperor's Cup. 2012 is Sérgio Soares's first season at Cerezo after Levir Culpi left at the end of last season.

Players

Current squad

As of December 18, 2010

2011 season transfers

In Winter

Out Winter

Competitions

J.League

League table

Matches

J.League Cup

Quarter-final

Emperor's Cup

References 

Cerezo Osaka
Cerezo Osaka seasons